Flume is the debut studio album by Australian electronic musician Flume. It was released on 9 November 2012, by Future Classic. The deluxe edition of the album was released on 12 November 2013.

At the J Awards of 2013, the album won Australian Album of the Year.

Critical reception

Upon its release, Flume received generally positive reviews. At Metacritic, which assigns a normalised rating out of 100 to reviews from mainstream critics, the album holds an average score of 73, indicating "generally favorable reviews".

Track listing

Personnel

Credits for Flume adapted from Allmusic.

 Harley Streten – production
 Nick Murphy – composition 
 Jezzabell Doran – composition 
 Jessica Higgs – composition
 Jesse Sewell – composition
 George Tryfonos – composition
 Alex Ward – composition
 Jay Ryves – art direction
 Michael Zito – artwork

Charts

Weekly charts

Year-end charts

Decade-end charts

Certifications

References

2012 debut albums
Albums produced by Flume (musician)
ARIA Award-winning albums
Flume (musician) albums